Drogo (c.675 – 708) was a Frankish nobleman, the eldest son of Pippin of Heristal and Plectrudis. He was the duke of Champagne from the early 690s.

Drogo was born shortly after his parents' marriage, which probably took place in 675 or just after. In the early 680s, Pippin arranged the marriage of Drogo with Anstrudis (or Adaltrudis), the daughter of Waratto, the mayor of the palace in Neustria, and his wife Ansfledis. The marriage took place toward the end of the decade or in the early 690s. Drogo and Anstrudis had four sons: Arnulf, who succeeded him as duke of Champagne; Hugh, who entered the church and rose to become an archbishop; Gotfrid; and Pippin.

The marriage of Drogo and Anstrudis increased his father Pippin's influence in Neustria. Waratto's family properties were located mainly in the vicinity of Rouen. Drogo, however, was made duke in Champagne, a frontier region between Neustria and Austrasia. His power in Champagne was enhanced through his control of the monastery of Montier-en-Der and possibly the monastery of Hautvillers.

The Liber Historiae Francorum, a history of the Franks written in Neustria in 727, portrays the Austrasian Drogo as sympathetic to the Neustrians because of his marital connections. He did, however, fall foul of the abbey of Saint-Denis, which sued him in the king's court in a property dispute. King Childebert III ruled in Saint-Denis's favour. Drogo also lost a lawsuit over the villa of Noisy-sur-Oise with the monastery of Tussonval in 697.

Drogo predeceased his father, dying in 707, according to the Gesta abbatum Fontanellensium, or in 708, according to most of the annals. He was buried in the church of Saint Arnulf at Metz, to which his four sons made a grant of land in his honour in June 715.  The Annales Mettenses record that Grimoald succeeded Drogo in all his offices, but in fact his son Arnulf succeeded him as duke. The death of Drogo was perceived by later generations as a pivotal event in the history of the Carolingian dynasty. Several of the imperial annals written in the late eighth century begin their year-by-year accounts with 708. These include the Annales Alamannici, Annales Nazariani and Annales Laureshamenses.

References

Sources

670s births
708 deaths
Pippinids
7th-century Frankish nobility